Andreas Reinke (born 10 January 1969) is a German former professional footballer who played as a goalkeeper.

During his professional career, in which he appeared for six clubs in three countries, he played in 228 Bundesliga games during 11 seasons.

Career
Born in Krakow am See, Bezirk Schwerin, Reinke started playing senior football in his native East Germany with Dynamo Schwerin, moving in 1990 – with the nation already reunified – to Hamburger SV. There, he played his first game in the Bundesliga on 28 August 1991, a 0–3 home loss against Stuttgarter Kickers; that would be his only appearance for the first team in three years.

After helping FC St. Pauli narrowly miss out on promotion from the second division, Reinke signed with 1. FC Kaiserslautern, where he won his first trophies: in 1996, the Palatinate Forest side suffered top flight relegation but managed to win the cup, 1–0 against Karlsruher SC.

Reinke and Kaiserslautern immediately promoted back, amazingly repeating the feat of winning the league the following year, with the player conceding 53 in 56 matches both seasons combined.

Deemed surplus to requirements in the 2000 summer, Reinke spent the following three years abroad, starting in Greece with Iraklis Thessaloniki F.C. then moving to Real Murcia after one year. With the Spaniards, he won the Ricardo Zamora Trophy in the 2002–03 campaign as the club returned to La Liga; apart from only conceding 21 in 40 games he still found the net, converting a penalty kick in a 2–1 home win over CD Numancia.

Aged 34, Reinke returned to his country, signing with SV Werder Bremen. In his first year the club won the double, and he did not miss one second of action in that and the following seasons. However, he would be eventually pushed to the bench by younger Tim Wiese (who also played at Kaiserslautern) and retired from the game at the end of 2006–07, aged 38, having accomplished the feat of being the first goalkeeper to win the German championship with two different clubs.

Reinke started his coaching career shortly after, briefly being in charge of Germany under-21s goalkeepers. In 2013, he signed for Hansa Rostock in the same predicament.

Honours
1. FC Kaiserslautern
 Bundesliga: 1997–98
 2. Bundesliga: 1996–97

Real Murcia
 Segunda División: 2002–03

Werder Bremen
 Bundesliga: 2003–04
 DFB-Pokal: 1995–96, 2003–04
 DFB-Ligapokal: 2006

Individual
 Ricardo Zamora Trophy: 2002–03 (Segunda División)

References

External links

1969 births
Living people
German footballers
East German footballers
Association football goalkeepers
Bundesliga players
2. Bundesliga players
Hamburger SV II players
Hamburger SV players
FC St. Pauli players
1. FC Kaiserslautern players
SV Werder Bremen players
Super League Greece players
Iraklis Thessaloniki F.C. players
Segunda División players
Real Murcia players
German expatriate footballers
Expatriate footballers in Greece
Expatriate footballers in Spain
German expatriate sportspeople in Greece
German expatriate sportspeople in Spain
People from Bezirk Schwerin
People from Rostock (district)
Footballers from Mecklenburg-Western Pomerania